Jinna Navarat is a Thai actor and model, better known as Jinn Navarat.

Filmography

Film

Television

Short drama

Accolades

References

External links 
 
 
 

1993 births
Living people
Jinna Navarat
Jinna Navarat
Jinna Navarat
Jinna Navarat
Jinna Navarat
Jinna Navarat